Luis Felipe Hungria Martins (born 17 May 2001), known as just Luis Felipe, is a Brazilian footballer who plays as a defender for Cruzeiro.

Career statistics

Club

Notes

Honours
Cruzeiro
 Campeonato Brasileiro - Série B: 2022

References

2001 births
Living people
Brazilian footballers
Brazilian expatriate footballers
Association football defenders
Coritiba Foot Ball Club players
PSV Eindhoven players
Jong PSV players
Cruzeiro Esporte Clube players
Eerste Divisie players
Brazilian expatriate sportspeople in the Netherlands
Expatriate footballers in the Netherlands